Maurice O'Connell (born 20 October 1936 in Penang, Malaysia) is a former Fine Gael politician in Ireland. He was a Senator from 1981 to 1983, elected to the short-lived 15th Seanad and 16th Seanad on the Labour Panel. He was defeated in the 1983 election to the 17th Seanad.

His great uncle Sir William Hickie served as a Senator from 1925 to 1936.

See also
Families in the Oireachtas

References

1936 births
Living people
Fine Gael senators
Members of the 15th Seanad
Members of the 16th Seanad